Dr. Ali Alyami is the Executive Director and founder of the Center for Democracy and Human Rights in Saudi Arabia, based in Washington, DC.

Biography
Ali Alyami was born and raised in Saudi Arabia. In 1967, he emigrated to the United States on an Aramco scholarship. He received an M.A. from California State University, Los Angeles, and a PhD from the Claremont Graduate University.

He has worked for the Arab Organization for Human Rights in Cairo, Egypt, the Saudi Institute in Washington, DC, and the American Friends Service Committee in San Francisco. In 2004, he founded the Center for Democracy and Human Rights in Saudi Arabia.
Dr. Alyami has also delivered expert testimony, before the US Congressional Human Rights Conference, about human rights in his home country Saudi Arabia.

References

See also 
Ali Alyami, "Saudi Arabia at a Crossroads", Free Muslim Coalition Against Terrorism, June 20, 2012
Ali Alyami, "Saudi Arabia at a Crossroads", essay posted as comment at Saudi Jeans,  June 26, 2012

Living people
Saudi Arabian emigrants to the United States
California State University, Los Angeles alumni
Claremont Graduate University alumni
American human rights activists
Year of birth missing (living people)